Conosapium is a plant genus of the family Euphorbiaceae first described as a genus in 1863. It contains only one known species, Conosapium madagascariense, which is endemic to Madagascar.

References

Hippomaneae
Monotypic Euphorbiaceae genera
Endemic flora of Madagascar